Tomislav Arčaba  (born 25 March 1986) is an Australian professional football goalkeeper who last played with Rockdale City Suns.

Club career
After playing with Wollongong Wolves until 2006, first in the NSL then since 2004 in the NSW Premier League, he signed in January 2007 with Irish club Sligo Rovers FC. After playing with Sligo Rovers in the 2007 League of Ireland he moved in January 2008 to Romanian club FC Gloria Buzău. After a season and a half he moved to another Liga I club, FC Internaţional Curtea de Argeş. In January 2011 he leaves Romania and signes with Serbian club FK BSK Borča where he played until summer 2012.

Arcaba signed a six-month deal with Newcastle Jets in January 2017.

In 2020, he returned to Australia and played for Rockdale City Suns FC for 2020 NPL NSW.

International career
He is a former Australian U-20 international.

References

External links
 Tomislav Arčaba Stats at Utakmica.rs
 
 
 
 

1982 births
Living people
Australian people of Serbian descent
Australian soccer players
Association football goalkeepers
Australian expatriate soccer players
Sligo Rovers F.C. players
Expatriate association footballers in the Republic of Ireland
FC Gloria Buzău players
FC Internațional Curtea de Argeș players
Liga I players
Newcastle Jets FC players
Rockdale Ilinden FC players
Expatriate footballers in Romania
Australian expatriate sportspeople in Romania
FK BSK Borča players
OFK Beograd players
Serbian SuperLiga players
Expatriate footballers in Serbia